The Škoda 19 T is a five carbody section low-floor bi-directional tram, developed by Škoda Transportation for Wrocław.

The tram is not different from currently used Škoda 16 T trams, except for the fact that it has two driver's cabins and doors on both sides of the tram. It also features more CCTV, place for bicycles and baggage in the centre section, and the seats in the end sections are located in the driving direction, not sideways as the predecessor's. The tram type exclusively serves Wrocław 's 31, 32 and 33 lines (Tramwaj Plus). The vehicle is designed by Porsche Design Group. The low-floor area represents 65% of the entire vehicle floor. The tram is air-conditioned.

Production 
As of  2010, there are going to be 31 trams produced and delivered Wrocław.

The first vehicle was delivered in December 2010 and all of them were in Wrocław by the end of 2011.

Tramwaj Plus 
The Tramwaj Plus is a special tram line project which includes the use of Škoda 19 T. The vehicles moving along the designated tracks of the line will always have the green light on intersections. The line terminates at the Euro 2012 Stadium in Wrocław.

There were stewardesses in the tram during the UEFA Euro 2012 Championships, who were instated to assist tourists and fans. There is a seat marked '"i"' designated for a stewardess in each tram.

References

External links 

  News on Škoda webpages
  Pictures of first manufactured 19T in a Polish online newspaper

Tram vehicles of Poland
Škoda trams

de:Škoda Elektra#19T Zweirichtungsversion für Breslau